Johnny Belinda may refer to:
 Johnny Belinda (play), a 1940 Broadway play by Elmer Blaney Harris, including a list of adaptations
 Johnny Belinda (1948 film), a 1948 American drama film based on the play
 Johnny Belinda (1959 film), a 1959 Australian television play
 Johnny Belinda (1967 film), a 1967 television movie based on the play
 Johnny Belinda, a 1968 musical play by Mavor Moore and John Fenwick
 Johnny Belinda (1982 film), a 1982 film starring Rosanna Arquette